Ashill (pronounced Ash- ill ) is a village and civil parish in the English county of Norfolk. The village is between Watton and Swaffham.

Parish
The civil parish has an area of 12.26 square kilometres and in the 2001 census had a population of 1,426 in 634 households. For the purposes of local government, the parish falls within the district of Breckland.

History
Ashill was originally called Asleigh, which meant a clearing in the Ash wood.
The parish church of St Nicholas dates from the 14th century and stands close to the group of houses that form the oldest part of the village. The village centres on the green and a duck pond. Drovers travelling to Swaffham market would stay overnight on the green, using a shed as accommodation, whilst their cattle grazed on the green and drank from the pond.

Community

School
The original school was built using funds from Rev. Bartholomew Edwards and opened in 1848. Bartholomew was the longest-serving incumbent of a single parish, totalling 76 years in Ashill, from 1813 to 1889.
The National Society for Promoting Religious Education built an adjoining classroom and school house in 1876 and the school name was changed to Ashill National School. The school house was taken over by Norfolk Education committee in 1957, however, this was subsequently sold on again in 1979. It is now the headquarters for the local St John Ambulance division.
The present school building, housing Ashill Voluntary Controlled Primary School, was opened by the Bishop of Lynn, The Right Reverend David Bentley, in 1989 and caters for 119 pupils.

Shops
Although the local Post Office has closed, there is a new general store in the village, and is now the only shop actively trading.

Amenities
The Community Centre complex was completed in the 1970s and provides Ashill with the main event hall, with a large grassed playing field for sporting activities with tennis court, basketball court and MUGA equipment as well as children's swings etc. It also houses recycling bottle and clothes banks. The Village Aid's Call-in centre was converted from the village coal store next to the pond and operates as a drop-in centre for the local community. Allotments are available from the Parish Council for a moderate rent. Ashill has facilities that cater for a wide age-range from a Toddlers club, the bowls club (indoor and outdoor) was operated from the Old Hall Leisure Centre, however, this has been closed in 2020 and both bowls clubs are seeking alternative venues in the village as at February 2021. The Hall remains open (which also has a fully licensed function suite and two bars). The Lodge Care Home for the elderly is under extensive renovation with new wings being added. The White Hart public house which was run as McTaggarts from 2010, was reopened under new management in October 2020 and now offers an extensive in house, takeaway and all day service for breakfast, coffee & cake and more.

The Ashill Recycling Centre is open all year and operates a very good system, covering almost all waste items.

Newsletter
The village has its own free monthly newsletter, Ashlink Magazine, which contains local notices, announcements, detail on local events, clubs, societies and submissions from local residents.

Churches
Anglican
The parish church of St Nicholas originates from the 14th century but also features many aspects from more recent times. The north windows hold some 15th-century mediaeval glass, the chancel features 19th-century glass by Lavers, Barraud and Westlake, whilst the roof is of 17th-century origin. The current incumbent is the Rev Jane Atkins.  Bell ringing practise takes place on a Thursday night – new ringers always welcome.

Anglican – Missionary Congregation (Extra Parishional)
There is also a Charismatic Anglican congregation present in the village that operates outside of the parish system but is still a member of the Church of England.  It was first planted in 1997 after a controversy over the removal of the pews to allow more room in St. Nicolas.  The church moved between local community centres before buying a garage in Ashill and converting it into what is now the Well Christian Centre. The Well is not actually owned by the church but by a separate charity named "Cornerstone Building Trust" as it was decided on theological grounds it better not to be tied to just one property but have the freedom to move if need be.  The church facilitates Mid Norfolk Kidzklub, folYOUTH, Intents Festival, Good companions, Women Together as well as being the founding member of the Fountain Network. The congregation is reasonably diverse in relation to the local demographics and in late 2012 saw 250–300 people on a regular Sunday morning.

Brethren

Methodist
Ashill Methodist Church is a 92-year-old brickwork building situated in Hale Road. The chapel has now closed and is being converted to a residential building.

References

External links

Information from Genuki Norfolk on Ashill.
Ashill village pages.
1883 Kelly's Directory entry for Ashill, 1883, p.229

 
Villages in Norfolk
Civil parishes in Norfolk
Breckland District